The Portuguese Chess Federation is the governing body for chess in Portugal. It is affiliated to FIDE. Its president is Dominic Cross.

Portuguese Team Championship

Up to 2008, the national team championship was a 9-round competition involving 10 teams. Each match was played across four boards. From 2009 to 2011, the championship was fought by 16 teams across six boards (2009-2010; four boards 2011). The 2012 edition returned to the old model.

Portuguese Chess Cup
The Portuguese Chess Cup is open to all clubs registered with the Portuguese Chess Federation. Each match is played across four boards.

Portuguese Individual Championship

The Portuguese Chess Championship is the annual individual national chess championship of Portugal. It was established in 1911.

References

External links
 

National members of the European Chess Union
Chess in Portugal
Chess
1927 establishments in Portugal
Sports organizations established in 1927
Chess organizations
1927 in chess
Organisations based in Lisbon
Chess